Panjpeer Rocks is a tourist attraction. It is located in Union Council Narar of Tehsil Kahuta, about 70 km away from the capital Islamabad. Adjacent places include Punjar, Kotli Sattian, and Sore village that includes Manjan Lake and Sore Waterfall.

History
The rocks are named after five holy men who meditated a thousand year ago.

References

Tourist attractions in Rawalpindi
Rock formations